Liga Forward is the highest tier of basketball in the country Kyrgyzstan, which began in 1992 when Kyrgyzstan became independent from the Soviet Union. It features class teams such as Dank, Tulpar Skafkis and Bishkek Dynamo.

Teams

Former teams

Basketball in Kyrgyzstan
Basketball
1992 establishments in Kyrgyzstan
Sports leagues established in 1992
Kyrgyzstan